The Sydney Harbour Bridge cycleway is a  conjoined cycleway from the north and south that crosses the Sydney Harbour Bridge on its western side, linking the Sydney central business district with North Sydney, Sydney's Northern Suburbs and the North Shore, in Sydney, New South Wales, Australia.

Route
The southern terminus of the cycleway is at Millers Point with access to Argyle Street and Upper Fort Street in The Rocks. At its southern terminus near the Sydney Observatory, the cycleway is located adjacent to the Western Distributor and connects with the Kent Street cycleway. The northern terminus of the cycleway is at Burton Street, Milsons Point, just below Milsons Point railway station. A campaign to eliminate the steps on this popular cycling route to the CBD has been running since at least 2008.

The absence of an efficient or safe cycleway or cycle paths to access the Bridge has resulted in the HarbourLink proposal to give better access to the Sydney Harbour Bridge's northern approach. The NSW Bike Plan 2010 identified Naremburn to the Harbour Bridge as one of 13 major missing links and a priority metropolitan link. On 7 December 2016 the NSW Roads Minister Duncan Gay confirmed that the northern stairway would be replaced with a 20 million ramp alleviating the need for cyclists to dismount. At the same time the NSW Government announced plans to upgrade the southern ramp at a projected cost of 15 million.

As of April 2021, Transport for NSW refused to release current plans, partly because it would be unable to “deal with the anticipated volume of communications” from the public. On 3 May, two preferred options were revealed:  a two-storey spiral and a long slope.  There was local opposition to both options. In August, the government announced that consultation had attracted about 2,800 responses of which 82% favoured a linear option, and in December it opened a public competition among three shortlisted linear designs. On 1 April 2022, it was announced that a 200-metre ramp, with an average gradient of 2 per cent, had been approved. That plan was controversial, but was approved by North Sydney Council on 28 February 2023; it has still to be approved by the state government.

For the northern terminus there is a long-term plan to link the Sydney Harbour Bridge cycleway with the Gore Hill and Epping Road cycleways, to the northwest.

Cycleway use
In 2019, the average number of cycle trips varied between 1500 and 2000 on an average weekday.

The NSW Roads Regulations state that a person must not ride a bicycle on any part of the Sydney Harbour Bridge other than a cycleway.

See also
Bike paths in Sydney
Cycling in New South Wales
Cycling in Sydney

References

External links
Bicycle NSW website
City of Sydney - Cycling

Cycling in Sydney
Cyclist bridges in Australia
Cycleway